Garten is an unincorporated community and census-designated place (CDP) in Fayette County, West Virginia, United States. As of the 2020 census, it had a population of 204.

References 

Populated places in Fayette County, West Virginia
Census-designated places in Fayette County, West Virginia
Census-designated places in West Virginia